The Ingalalla Waterfalls, also known as Ingalalla Falls, is  a cascade waterfall in the  Australian state of South Australia, located in the locality of Hay Flat within the District Council of Yankalilla, on an unnamed creek on the Fleurieu Peninsula.

Its name was approved on 25 May 2000 in response to "a request for clarification from the Royal Automobile Association on which name to use for the feature."

There is a strenuous bush walk starting at the waterfall and tracking through parts of the Second Valley Forest, around Mount Hayfield nearby. Mount Hayfield is a significant Aboriginal site due to its connection with the Kaurna Dreaming story of the hero Tjilbruke. Tjilbruke, the creator being of the Kaurna people, is said to have created yellow ochre at this site.

See also

 List of waterfalls of South Australia
List of parks and gardens in rural South Australia

References

External links

Waterfalls of South Australia
Fleurieu Peninsula
Cascade waterfalls